Venture capital in Israel refers to the financial capital provided to early-stage, high-potential, high risk, growth startup companies based in Israel. The country's venture capital industry was born in the mid-1980s and has rapidly developed since. Israel currently has more than 276 active venture capital funds, of which 71 are international VCs with Israeli offices. Israel's venture capital and incubator industry plays an important role in the booming high-tech sector that has been given the nickname "Silicon Wadi", considered second in importance only to its Californian counterpart, the Silicon Valley.

According to IVC, Israeli Research Center, in 2021, Israeli tech exits (M&As, buyouts, IPOs) totaled $22.2 billion from 238 deals. Excluding deals over $5 billion, 2021 capital saw almost 50% from IPOs while the number of M&As did not fall short compared to previous years. According to a report from Start-Up Nation Central (SNC) the three largest earning sectors in Israel were Enterprise IT & Data Infrastructure (which raised just under $6b), Cybersecurity-dominated Security Technologies ($5.9b), and Fintech ($4.2b).

According to IVC, In 2021, venture capital investment in Israel stood at $25.6 billion – a leap of almost 150% from 2020.

History
Israel's venture capital industry was born in 1985, when the first Israeli venture capital fund, Athena Venture Partners, was founded by Major-General Dan Tolkowsky, the past Chief of Staff of the Israel Air Force; Dr. Gideon Tolkowsky; and Frederick R. Adler, a pillar of the US venture capital industry who had conceived the notion of taking Israeli High-tech companies public on NASDAQ. Subsequently, in 1990, Gideon Tolkowsky and Yadin Kaufmann founded Israel's second VC firm, "Veritas Venture Capital Management", whose main investors were Anglo American Corporation of South Africa and De Beers.

The success of the venture capital industry in Israel continued with Yozma (Hebrew for "initiative"), a government initiative in 1993 offering attractive tax incentives to foreign venture-capital investments in Israel and promising to double any investment with funds from the government. As a result of their efforts, Israel's annual venture-capital outlays rose nearly 60-fold, from $58 million to $3.3 billion, between 1991 and 2000. The number of companies launched using Israeli venture funds rose from 100 to 800.  Israel's information-technology revenues rose from $1.6 billion to $12.5 billion. By 1999, Israel ranked second only to the United States in invested private-equity capital as a share of GDP.  It also led the world in the share of its growth attributable to high-tech ventures: 70 percent. According to the OECD, Israel is also ranked first in the world in expenditure on Research and Development (R&D) as a percentage of GDP.

Though Israel's venture capital industry played an important role in the high-tech sector, the financial crisis of 2007-2010 also affected the availability of venture capital locally. In 2009, there were 63 mergers and acquisitions in the Israeli market worth a total of $2.54 billion; 7% below 2008 levels ($2.74 billion), when 82 Israeli companies were merged or acquired, and 33% lower than 2007 proceeds ($3.79 billion) when 87 Israeli companies were merged or acquired.

In 2019 Israeli companies are considered to be more popular than their American peers. For comparison, investments volume in Israeli startups grew by 140% during 2014-2018 and investments in technological startups from the U.S. grew by 64%. Moreover, Israeli startups are becoming so attractive that US companies tend to acquire them more than anyone else: they account for half of all transactions in 2018. Thus, Israel eventually became a “net seller”. In particular, artificial intelligence (AI) raises most investments (17%) among all high technologies in Israel. The recent acquisition of Israeli company Mellanox for $6.9 billion by Nvidia Corporation is indicative. It was a definite contender for the largest M&A deal in 2019.

Characterization
Israel's venture capital industry has about 276 active venture capital funds, of which 71 international VCs with Israeli offices. Additionally, there are some 220 international funds, including Polaris Venture Partners, Accel Partners, Greylock Partners, that do not have branches in Israel, but actively invest in Israel through an in-house specialist.

In 2009, the  Life Sciences Sector led the market with $272 million or 24% of total capital raised, followed by the Software Sector with $258 million or 23%, the Communications sector with $219 million or 20%, and the Internet sector with 13% of capital raised in 2009.

The unicorns era
The term "unicorn" was coined by venture capitalist Aileen Lee in 2013 to define a privately held startup with a value of $1 billion or more. It was originally used to portray the rarity of such companies. As of 2021, over 70 unicorns exist in Israel or were founded by Israelis – making Israel the number one country in the world in its number of unicorns per capita.

The first Israeli company to be named a unicorn was ironSource, reaching a value of $1.5 billion in 2014. Since then the rate of new Israeli unicorns has risen exponentially. From 2014 to 2018 the total number of new unicorns was 19 combined, 2019 had 12 new unicorns and 2020 a total of 14, whereas in 2021 there were an astonishing number of 28 companies including Wiz, K-health, Verbit, Deel and Honey Book, a 200% increase compared to the previous year.

As a result, more foreign venture capital funds are currently invested in Israeli or Israeli-led unicorns including Andreessen Horowitz, Spark Capital, Vertex Ventures, Insight Partners and corporate venture capital funds including Intel Capital, Microsoft Ventures (M12) and others.

Technological business incubators
In the early 1990s, the Israeli government created a technological business incubator program (Hebrew: חממה טכנולוגית) to leverage the strengths of approximately 750,000 scientists, engineers, and physicians who had just arrived from the former USSR. Israel's Office of the Chief Scientist (OCS), a division of the Ministry of Economy, started six incubators designed to foster seed and early-stage technology development through entrepreneurship. Today there are 24 such incubators located throughout Israel, and 65 percent of the projects are science-related research and development.

In 2007, incubator companies raised $435 million in private funds, up 74 percent from 2006. Currently, the OCS allocates approximately $1 billion per year to incubators and other programs that encourage technology development

See also
Silicon Wadi
Economy of Israel
Science and technology in Israel
List of Israeli companies quoted on the Nasdaq
Start-up Nation: The Story of Israel's Economic Miracle

References

External links
Directory of venture capital funds in Israel
Venture capital in Israel at MFA.gov.il
Full list of Israeli unicorns in Tech Aviv Project

Finance in Israel
Science and technology in Israel
Venture capital